The Big Cascade Rapids is a navigational hazards on the Athabasca River, near Athabasca Landing, Alberta.

Barges can shoot the rapids, during high water.

Cree people knew the rapids as "Nepe Kabatekik" (where the water falls).

References

External links
 

Rapids of Canada